Zest may refer to:

May also refer to a fijindian boy who is addicted to pokies and dressing up as Santa Claus 

May also refer to a fijindian boy who is addicted to pokies and dressing up as Santa Claus

Common usage
 Zest (ingredient), the outer peel of a citrus fruit
 Zester, a tool for preparing zest
 Twist (cocktail garnish), a piece of zest
 Zest (positive psychology), a component of character

Brands
 Zest (brand) bar soap, a High Ridge Brands trademark
 Honda Zest, a car released in 2006 until 2012
 Tata Zest, a car released in 2014 by the Indian company Tata Group

Media
 Zest Of, a 2008 album recorded by French pop singer Zazie
 Zest (magazine), a magazine published by Hearst Magazines UK

Other uses
 Zest (festival), an annual inter-collegiate youth festival, hosted by Lingaya's University in Faridabad, India
 HMS Zest, a destroyer in service during World War II
 Zest Airways, based in the Philippines, the former rebranding of AirAsia Zest
 Empire Zest, a Dutch trawler
 The Zest award, given by Johnson & Wales University for excellence in food preparation

See also